Attila Monostori (born 28 January 1971) is a Hungarian water polo player. He competed in the men's tournament at the 1996 Summer Olympics.

References

External links
 

1971 births
Living people
Hungarian male water polo players
Olympic water polo players of Hungary
Water polo players at the 1996 Summer Olympics
Water polo players from Budapest